Jana Rychlá (born Jana Pospíšilová on 23 March 1970) is a former professional tennis player from the Czech Republic.

Career
As a junior, Pospíšilová was a member of the Czechoslovak team which won the 1986 World Youth Cup in Japan and she was runner-up to Natasha Zvereva in the girls' singles at the 1987 French Open.

In both 1988 and 1989 she competed for Czechoslovakia in the Federation Cup. When Czechoslovakia won the competition in 1988, Pospíšilová featured in all five World Group matches, as the doubles partner of Jana Novotná. The pair were unbeaten until losing in the final to the USSR, but Czechoslovakia had already secured the title after winning both singles matches. In 1989 she played in two ties, again as a doubles player, this time partnering Regina Rajchrtová.

Pospíšilová began competing on the WTA Tour in 1988. In her first season she had a win over second-seeded Helena Suková in a match at the 1988 European Indoors and lost the final of the Southern Cross Classic to Fed Cup teammate Jana Novotná, to finish at 50th in the year-end rankings. She peaked at 49 in the world early in 1989. Other career highlights include wins over Hana Mandlíková at the 1989 Canadian Open held in Toronto and victory against Pam Shriver at the 1990 NSW Open in Sydney. At the 1990 Athens Trophy, Pospíšilová partnered with Leona Lásková to reach her only career doubles final. The final was decided by a last set tie-break, which they lost 6–8 to Laura Garrone and Karin Kschwendt.

Personal life
Pospíšilová's is the elder sister of Czech tennis player Jaroslav Pospíšil.

She has been married to Czech actor Petr Rychlý since 2006.

WTA Tour career finals

Singles: 1 runner-up

Doubles: 1 runner-up

ITF finals

Singles (6–3)

Doubles (15–6)

References

External links
 
 
 

1970 births
Living people
Czechoslovak female tennis players
Czech female tennis players
People from Prague-East District
Sportspeople from the Central Bohemian Region